This is a list of mines in Germany.

Coal
Garzweiler open pit mine
Hambach open pit mine
Luisenthal Mine
Profen coal mine
Zeche Neuglück & Stettin
Zollern II/IV Colliery
Zollverein Coal Mine Industrial Complex

Copper
Rammelsberg

Iron
Hansa Pit
Roter Bär Pit
Schacht Konrad

Lead
Rammelsberg

Silver
Glasebach Pit
Samson Pit

Slate
Fell Exhibition Slate Mine

Salt
 Asse II
 Berchtesgaden

References

Germa
 
Mine